Nakoleia also known as Nakolaion (Νακώλαιον), Latinized as Nacolia or Nacolea, was an ancient and medieval city in Phrygia. It corresponds to present-day Seyitgazi, Eskişehir Province in the Central Anatolia region of Turkey.

History
It was a town of Phrygia Salutaris, taking its name in legend from the nymph Nacole (Νακώλη and Νακόλη), and had no history in antiquity.

The area was known for its fertility in late Roman times, thanks to the river Parthenios (Seyit Su), and was wooded in the late 4th century (it is now deforested). It was there that Valens defeated the usurper Procopius in 366 AD (see Battle of Thyatira); under Arcadius it was occupied by a garrison of Goths under Tribigild who revolted against the emperor in 399 AD. In 782, it was temporarily captured by the Abbasid Caliphate.

Bishopric
At first a suffragan of Synnada, the see of Nakoleia became important in the early 8th century, when its bishop Constantine became one of the leading proponents of Byzantine Iconoclasm under Leo III the Isaurian (ruled 717–741) and was later condemned as an heresiarch at the Second Council of Nicaea (787). Nakoleia was elevated to the rank of an archbishopric between 787 and 862, and eventually to a metropolitan see between 1035 and 1066, when its incumbent appears in the last place among the metropolitans attending a council. The see continued in existence as a metropolis, without suffragans, until the 14th century. Nakoleia is included, with archiepiscopal rank, in the Catholic Church's list of titular sees and has been left without titular bishops since 1973.

References 

Populated places of the Byzantine Empire
Populated places in Phrygia
Roman towns and cities in Turkey
History of Eskişehir Province
Former populated places in Turkey
Nacolia
Dioceses of the Ecumenical Patriarchate of Constantinople